Scombroid is used as a descriptor used for:

Scombroid may refer to:

 Scombridae, a family of fish which are widely consumed globally
 Scombroid food poisoning, which is typically associated with eating spoiled fish